Michael Penix Jr. (born May 8, 2000) is an American football quarterback for the Washington Huskies of the Pac-12 Conference. He previously played for the Indiana Hoosiers of the Big Ten Conference before transferring to Washington in 2022.

Early life and high school career
Born and raised in Tampa, Florida, Penix attended Tampa Bay Technical High School and started at quarterback for the Titans for two seasons, passing for 4,243 yards with 61 touchdowns and only six interceptions. He committed to Indiana University to play college football.

College career

Indiana
As a true freshman in 2018 at Indiana, Penix played in three games, suffered a torn ACL, and was redshirted. He completed 21 of 34 passes for 219 yards and a touchdown. Named the starter entering the 2019 season, Penix played in only six games due to injury, completing 110 of 160 passes for 1,394 yards, with ten touchdowns and four interceptions. Penix returned to Indiana as the starter in 2020. On November 30, he was ruled out for the season after suffering a torn ACL in a win against Maryland.

Washington
On December 22, 2021, Penix transferred to the University of Washington, and led the Huskies to an 11–2 record in 2022. Penix was the FBS leader in passing yards for the 2022 regular season. He also became the Washington Huskies all time single-season passing leader during the Alamo Bowl. On December 4, 2022, Penix announced on Twitter that he would return to the Huskies for the 2023 season.

Statistics

References

External links
 
 Washington Huskies bio
 Indiana Hoosiers bio

2000 births
Living people
Players of American football from Tampa, Florida
American football quarterbacks
Indiana Hoosiers football players
Washington Huskies football players